Earl Clifford Snyder (born May 6, 1976) is a former Major League Baseball player who played in the Major Leagues for the Cleveland Indians and Boston Red Sox. In his short time in the majors, Snyder played first base, third base, and designated hitter, but in the minors, he played third, first, outfield, shortstop, two games at designated hitter, and one game at second base.

The 6'0", 207 pound Snyder attended Plainville High School in Connecticut and attended the University of Hartford, where he played college baseball for the Hawks. While in college, he played for the Middletown Giants and Danbury Westerners of the New England Collegiate Baseball League. In 1996, he played collegiate summer baseball with the Wareham Gatemen of the Cape Cod Baseball League. He was drafted in the 1998 Major League Baseball Draft in the 36th round by the New York Mets, but only reached the Triple-A level with them.

On December 13, the Mets sent Snyder and Billy Traber to the Cleveland Indians, completing a deal in which the Mets traded Matt Lawton, Alex Escobar, Jerrod Riggan, and two players to be named (Snyder and Traber) to Cleveland in exchange for All-Star Roberto Alomar, Mike Bacsik and Danny Peoples.

After playing the  season with both the Indians and Triple-A Buffalo Bisons, Snyder was claimed off waivers by the Boston Red Sox on January 17, . He also won the Player of the Week Award on May 3, 2004.

Snyder is right-handed and resides in Connecticut

References

External links
Earl Snyder Interview
Career statistics and player information from The Baseball Cube
Snyder's SoxProspects.com Bio

1976 births
Living people
Boston Red Sox players
Cleveland Indians players
Hartford Hawks baseball players
Baseball players from Connecticut
Major League Baseball third basemen
St. Lucie Mets players
Norfolk Tides players
Buffalo Bisons (minor league) players
Pawtucket Red Sox players
Durham Bulls players
Louisville Bats players
Charlotte Knights players
Pittsfield Mets players
Capital City Bombers players
Binghamton Mets players
Wareham Gatemen players
Sportspeople from New Britain, Connecticut